The Ethical Journalism Network (EJN) is an organisation created to 'strengthen the craft of journalism and to promote for the public benefit high ethical standards in journalism'. It was created in 2011 to promote training on ethics and governance in journalism by a coalition of over seventy groups of journalists, editors, press owners and media support groups. Its work includes developing a test for journalists to expose hate speech, guidelines on reporting conflict and producing reports on covering migration. The EJN's multi-country reports provide information on the realities of how media work and the challenges of self-regulation and credibility inside journalism.

External links 
 Official website

Sources

References 

Journalism organizations in Europe
Organisations based in London